The Makarov pistol or PM is a Soviet semi-automatic pistol. Under the project leadership of Nikolay Fyodorovich Makarov, it became the Soviet Union's standard military and Militsiya side arm in 1951.

Development
Shortly after the Second World War, the Soviet Union   reactivated its plans to replace the TT pistols and Nagant M1895 revolvers. The adoption of the future AK assault rifle relegated the pistol to a light, handy self-defense weapon. The TT was unsuited for such a role, as it was heavy and bulky. Also, the Tokarev pistols omitted a safety and magazines were deemed too easy to lose. As a result, in December 1945, two separate contests for a new service pistol were created, respectively for a 7.62mm and 9mm pistol. It was later judged that the new 9.2×18mm cartridge, designed by B. V. Semin, was the best round suited for the intended role. The lower pressures of the cartridge allowed practical straight blowback operation (reducing the cost and complexity of the weapon), while retaining low recoil and good stopping power.

Several engineers took part in the contest, including Korovin, Baryshev, Voyevodin, Simonov, Rakov, Klimov, Lobanov, Sevryugin, and Makarov. Special emphasis was placed on safety, user-friendliness, accuracy, weight, and dimensions. After stringent handling, reliability, and other tests, Makarov's design, influenced by the German Walther PP, stood out from the others through its sheer simplicity, excellent reliability, quick disassembly, and robustness. During April 1948, Makarov's pistol experienced 20 times fewer malfunctions than the competing Baryshev and Sevryugin counterparts, and had fewer parts. The pistol was therefore selected in 1949 for further development and optimization for mass production. Tooling was set up in the Izhevsk plant for production. After many major design changes and tweaks, the gun was formally adopted as the "9mm Pistolet Makarova", or "PM" in December 1951.

As the new standard issue sidearm of the USSR, the PM was issued to Non-commissioned officers, police, special forces, and tank and air crews. It remained in wide front-line service with Soviet military and police until and beyond the end of the USSR in 1991. Variants of the pistol remain in production in Russia, China, and Bulgaria. In the U.S., surplus Soviet and East German military Makarovs are listed as eligible curio and relic items by the Bureau of Alcohol, Tobacco, Firearms and Explosives, because the countries of manufacture, the USSR and the GDR, no longer exist.

In 2003, the Makarov PM was formally replaced by the PYa pistol in Russian service, although , large numbers of Makarov pistols are still in Russian military and police service. The PM is still the service pistol of many Eastern European and former Soviet republics. North Korea and Vietnam also use PMs as standard-issue pistols, however North Korea has since switched to the CZ-75 made locally as the BaekDuSan pistol.

Although various pistols had been introduced in Russian service to replace the Makarov, none have been able to entirely supplant it; the MP-443 Grach/PYa is technically the Russian military's standard sidearm but suffers from quality control and reliability issues. In September 2019, Rostec announced its Udav pistol went into mass production as the Makarov replacement. The Udav fires 9×21mm Gyurza rounds which are claimed to pierce 1.4 mm of titanium or 4 mm of steel at a 100 meters.

Design
The PM is a medium-size, straight-blowback-action, all-steel construction, frame-fixed barrel handgun. In blowback designs, the only force holding the slide closed is that of the recoil spring; upon firing, the barrel and slide do not have to unlock, as do locked-breech-design pistols. Blowback designs are simple and more accurate than designs using a recoiling, tilting, or articulated barrel, but they are limited practically by the weight of the slide. The 9×18mm cartridge is a practical cartridge in blowback-operated pistols; producing a respectable level of energy from a gun of moderate weight and size. The PM is heavy for its size by modern US commercial handgun standards, largely because in a blowback pistol, the heavy slide provides greater inertia to delay opening of the breech until internal pressures have fallen to a safe level. Other, more powerful cartridges have been used in blowback pistol designs, but the Makarov is widely regarded as particularly well balanced in its design elements.

The general layout and field-strip procedure of the Makarov pistol is similar to that of the PP. However, designer N. Makarov and his team drastically simplified the construction of the pistol, improving reliability and reducing the part count to 27, not including the magazine. This allowed considerable ease of manufacture and servicing. All of the individual parts of the PM have been optimised for mass production, robustness and interchangeability, partially thanks to captured German tooling, technology, and machinery.

The chrome-lined, four-groove, 9.27mm caliber barrel is pressed and pinned to the frame through a precision-machined ring. The 7 kg recoil spring wraps around and is guided by the barrel. The spring-loaded trigger guard is pivoted down and swung to either side on the frame, allowing removal of the slide. The front sight is integrally machined into the slide, and a 3–4 mm wide textured strip is engraved on top of the slide in order to prevent aim-disturbing glare. The rear sight is dovetailed into the slide and multiple heights are available to adjust the impact point. The extractor is of an external spring-loaded type, and features a prominent flange preventing loss if a case should rupture. The breech face is deeply recessed in order to aid in extraction and ejection reliability. The stamped sheet steel slide-lock lever has a tail serving the purpose of ejector. The one-piece, wraparound bakelite or plastic grip is reinforced with steel inserts and has a detent inside the screw bushing preventing unscrewing during firing. The sheet-metal mainspring housed inside the grip panel powers the hammer in both the main and rebound stroke, the trigger and the disconnector, while its lower end is the heel and spring of the magazine catch. The sear spring also serves another function, powering the slide lock lever. Makarov pistol parts seldom break with normal usage, and are easily serviced using few tools.

The PM has a free-floating triangular firing pin, with no firing pin spring or firing pin block. This theoretically allows the possibility of accidental firing if the pistol is dropped on its muzzle. Designer Nikolay Makarov thought the firing pin of insufficient mass to constitute a major danger. The Makarov pistol is notable for the safety elements of its design, with a safety lever that simultaneously decocks and blocks the hammer from contacting the firing pin and returns the weapon to the long-trigger-pull mode of double action when that safety is engaged. When handled properly, the Makarov pistol has excellent security against accidental discharge caused by inadvertent pressure on the trigger, e.g., in carrying the weapon in dense brush or re-holstering it. However, the heavy trigger weight in double-action mode decreases first-shot accuracy. The Bulgarian-model Makarov pistol was approved for sale in the US state of California, having passed a state-mandated drop-safety test though the certification was not renewed and it has since been removed from the roster of approved handguns.

Operation
The PM has a DA/SA trigger mechanism. Engaging the manual safety simultaneously decocks the hammer if cocked, and prevents movement of slide, trigger and hammer. Both carrying with safety engaged, or with safety disengaged and hammer uncocked are considered safe. The DA trigger pull is heavy, requiring a strong squeeze, trading first shot accuracy for safety. Racking the slide, manually cocking the hammer or firing a cartridge all cock the hammer, setting the trigger for the next shot to single action. The PM is a semi-automatic firearm, therefore its rate of fire depends on how rapidly the shooter squeezes the trigger. Spent cartridges are ejected some 5.5–6 meters away to the shooter's right and rear. After firing the last round, the slide is held back by the slide stop lever/ejector. Magazines can be removed from the gun via the heel release, located on the bottom of the grip. After loading a fresh magazine, the slide can be released by pressing the lever on the left side of the frame or by racking the slide and releasing it; either action loads a cartridge into the chamber and readies the pistol to fire again.

Variants

The Makarov pistol was manufactured in several communist countries during the Cold War and afterwards; apart from the USSR itself, they were East Germany, Bulgaria, China, and post-reunification Germany, which also found itself with several thousand ex-GDR Makarov pistols.

The most widely known variant, the PMM (Pistolet Makarova Modernizirovannyy or Modernised Makarov pistol), was a redesign of the original gun. In 1990, a group of engineers reworked the original design, primarily by increasing the load for the cartridge. The result is a significant increase in muzzle velocity and generation of 25% more gas pressure. The PMM magazine holds 12 rounds, compared to the PM's eight rounds. Versions that held ten rounds were produced in greater quantities than the 12-round magazine. The PMM is able to use existing 9.2×18mm PM cartridges and has other minor modifications such as more ergonomic grip panels as well as flutes in the chamber that aid in extraction. As of 2015, it is—alongside MP-443 Grach—the service pistol of the Russian Airborne Troops.

A silenced version of the Makarov pistol, the PB, was developed for use by reconnaissance groups and the KGB, with a dedicated detachable suppressor.

An experimental variant of the Makarov pistol, the TKB-023, was designed with a polymer frame to reduce the weight and costs of the weapon. It had passed Soviet military trials but was never fielded, due to concerns about the polymer's capacities for long-term storage and use.

Poland, Hungary, and Czechoslovakia have developed their own handgun designs chambering the 9×18mm round. Hungary developed the FEG PA-63, Poland the P-64 and the P-83 Wanad and Czechoslovakia the vz.82. While similar in operation (straight blowback), and chambered for the same round, these pistols are often found labeled at gun shows by some US gun retailers as "Polish Makarovs" and "Hungarian Makarovs". Nonetheless, these cosmetically similar designs are independent of the PM and have more in common with the Walther PP (which, in fact, was also a major influence on the original Russian Makarov).

A wide variety of aftermarket additions and replacements exist for the Makarov pistol, including replacement barrels, custom grips, custom finishes and larger sights with various properties to replace the notoriously small originals. A scope/light mount exists for the Makarov pistol but requires a threaded replacement barrel.

Baikal
Baikal is a brand developed by IGP around which a series of shotgun products were designed from 1962. After the collapse of the USSR, commercial gun manufacture was greatly expanded under the Baikal brand.

During the 1990s, Baikal marketed various Makarov-derived handguns in the United States under the IJ-70 model. Included were handguns in both standard and high-capacity frames. They were available in .380 ACP in addition to the standard 9 mm Makarov round. Some minor modifications were made to facilitate importation into the United States, including the replacement of the rear fixed sight with an adjustable sight (only these Russian models marketed abroad feature an adjustable sight). A sporting version is the Baikal-442. The importation of these commercial models into the U.S. was later further restricted with the U.S. Government's importation ban on Russian firearms.

The Baikal IZH-79-8 is a modified version of the standard Makarov pistol, with an 8 mm barrel, modified to allow it to fire gas cartridges. These guns proved popular after the fall of the USSR, and were used in Eastern Europe for personal protection. However, unlike most gas firing guns, the body is made of standard Makarov-specification steel.

Users

 
 
 
 
 
 
 
 : Copy pistols were produced since 1960. Arsenal 10 produced them between 1970 and 2007. Can be recognized by means of the digit "10" enclosed within a circle stamped into the left side of the frame, straight hammer serrations, slim star grip grip panels w/star and lanyard ring.
 : Burundian rebels
 : Adopted by the People's Liberation Army in 1959 as the Type 59. Produced locally with minor cosmetic differences (i.e. the width of the slide's sight rail and configuration of the safety lever). The military version was produced from 1959 to 1960 in Factory 626, and featured a characteristic shield embossed with 5 stars on the grip shell. Civilian Type 59s were produced by Norinco for the export market.
  Chechen Republic of Ichkeria
 : Made under license.
 : Used by pro-Russian militas in 2014.
 : Copy pistols were produced. Known locally as "Pistole-M". Can be recognised through the plain dark grip shells, higher polish bluing, and early features (undrilled safety lever, round safety detent holes...). Special training cutaways with serial number prefix "SM" were also produced.
 
 
 
 
 : Used by pilots of the Indian Air Force.
 : Especially used by the TNI-AU officers in the 60s.
 
 
 
 
 : Copy pistols produced with parts sourced from Eastern Europe.
  Lugansk People's Republic
 
 : People's Movement for the Liberation of Azawad
 
 
 
 
 
 
  / : Used by the Romanian Police
 
 : 90+ Type 59 pistols acquired from 2001
 
 
 : Used by police units.
 
 
  Used alongside the Fort 12 
 
 : Made copies as the K59. Industry name known as SN9.
 : Used by the Zimbabwe National Army.

See also
 9×18mm Makarov
 Izhevsk Mechanical Plant
 List of Russian weaponry
 Makarych
 MP-448 Skyph
 Stechkin automatic pistol

References

Bibliography

External links

 Pistol Makarov 9 mm – Manufacturer, History, Technical Data, Classification, Handling, Ammunition, Manuals 
 Makarov Pictorial
 Technical data, instructional images and diagrams of the Makarov pistol 

9×18mm Makarov semi-automatic pistols
.380 ACP semi-automatic pistols
Cold War firearms of the Soviet Union
Police weapons
Semi-automatic pistols of Russia
Semi-automatic pistols of the Soviet Union
Izhevsk Mechanical Plant products
Weapons and ammunition introduced in 1951